Popovice  may refer to places in the Czech Republic:

Popovice (Benešov District), a municipality and village in the Central Bohemian Region
Popovice (Brno-Country District), a municipality and village in the South Moravian Region
Popovice (Uherské Hradiště District), a municipality and village in the Zlín Region
Velké Popovice, a municipality and village in the Central Bohemian Region
Vysoké Popovice, a municipality and village in the South Moravian Region

See also
Velkopopovický Kozel